Luis Pizarro may refer to:

 Luis Pizarro (boxer) (born 1962), Puerto Rican boxer
 Luis Pizarro Silva, Peruvian gymnast